The Finsen Laboratory is a cancer research lab at Rigshospitalet which is a part of Copenhagen University Hospital, Denmark. The lab was named in honour of the nobel laureate Niels Finsen. The lab conducts research about several aspects of how the plasminogen activation system contributes to tumor malignancy and metastasis.

External links
http://www.finsenlab.dk/ - The lab's homepage

Cancer hospitals